Harry Behn (September 24, 1898September 6, 1973) was an American screenwriter and children's author.

He was involved in writing scenes and continuities for a number of screenplays, including the war film The Big Parade in 1925, and Hell's Angels.  He graduated from Harvard University in 1922.

Filmography
The Big Parade (1925)
Proud Flesh (1925), with Agnes Christine Johnson
La Bohème (1926), with Ray Doyle
The Crowd (1928), with King Vidor and John V.A. Weaver                                                 
The Racket (1928), with Del Andrews
Frozen River (1929)
Sin Sister (1929), with Andrew Bennison
Hell's Angels (1930), with Howard Estabrook
Secret of the Chateau (1934), with Richard Thorpe

Bibliography
Siesta (poetry), Golden Bough, 1937
All Kinds of Time, Harcourt, 1950.
Rhymes of the Times, under the pen name Jim Hill, published privately, 1950.
Windy Morning, Harcourt, 1953.
The House beyond the Meadow, Pantheon, 1955.
The Wizard in the Well, Harcourt, 1956.
Chinese Proverbs from Olden Times, Peter Pauper, 1956.
(Translator and illustrator) Rainer Maria Rilke, Duino Elegies, Peter Pauper, 1957.
The Painted Cave, Harcourt, 1957.
Timmy's Search, Seabury, 1958.
The Two Uncles of Pablo, Harcourt, 1959.

(Translator) 300 Classic Haiku, Peter Pauper, 1962.
(Translator, along with Peter Beilenson) Haiku Harvest: Japanese haiku. Series IV, Peter Pauper, 1962.
The Faraway Lurs, World Publishing, 1963.
(Translator) Cricket Songs: Japanese haiku, Harcourt, 1964.
Omen of the Birds, World Publishing, 1964.
The Golden Hive, Harcourt, 1957–1966.
Chrysalis: Concerning Children and Poetry, Harcourt, 1949–1968.
What a Beautiful Noise, World Publishing, 1970.
(Translator) More Cricket Songs: Japanese haiku, Harcourt, 1971.
Crickets and Bullfrogs and Whispers of Thunder: Poems and Pictures, edited by Lee Bennett Hopkins, Harcourt, 1949–1984.
Trees: A Poem, illustrated by James Endicott, H. Holt (New York, NY), 1992.
Halloween, illustrated by Greg Couch, North-South (New York, NY), 2003.
The kite (Missing date).

Behn's translations of haiku provided the texts for two works by Norman Dinerstein:
Cricket Songs for unison children's chorus and piano (1967)
Frogs for SATB chorus (1977)

Notes

References
Book Poems: Poems from National Children's Book Week 1959–1998, page 26. Children's Book Council, 1998. 
Contemporary Authors Online, Gale, 2003. 
Rememberings, by Alice Lawrence Behn Goebel, edited by Pamela Behn Adam. Published privately, 1983[?]. 
St. James Guide to Children's Writers, 5th ed. St. James Press, 1999. 
HARRY BEHN DEAD; AN EARLY SCENARIST (obituary on page 38 of the New York Times, Monday, September 10, 1973)

External links

Guide to the Harry Behn papers at the University of Oregon

American male screenwriters
American children's writers
University of Arizona faculty
1898 births
1973 deaths
Japanese–English translators
20th-century translators
Harvard University alumni
Screenwriters from Arizona
20th-century American male writers
20th-century American screenwriters